Hamilton Rubio (born 4 March 1949), known as Chance, is a Brazilian footballer. He competed in the men's tournament at the 1968 Summer Olympics.

References

External links
 

1949 births
Living people
Brazilian footballers
Brazil international footballers
Olympic footballers of Brazil
Footballers at the 1968 Summer Olympics
Footballers from São Paulo
Association football forwards
Clube Atlético Juventus players